Maynas (Mayna, Maina), also known as Rimachu, is an extinct and unclassified language of Peru. Several sources have listed it as a dialect of Omurano, which also goes by the name Mayna, but Hammarström (2011) showed that they are separate languages. Attempts have been made to link Maynas with the Jivaroan, Cahuapanan, Zaparoan, and Candoshi languages, but they have not yet been conclusive (Campbell 2012).

It was once spoken between the Nucuray River, Chambira River, and Pastaza River.

References

Languages of Peru
Unclassified languages of South America
Extinct languages of South America
Cahuapanan languages